The 2017 NRL finals series was the 20th annual edition of the NRL final series, the Rugby League tournament staged to determine the winner of the 2017 NRL Season. The series ran over four weekends in September and October 2017, culminating with the 2017 NRL Grand Final at the ANZ Stadium on 1 October 2017.

The top eight teams from the 2017 NRL Season qualified for the finals series. NRL finals series have been played under the current format since 2012. The qualifying teams are Melbourne, Sydney, Brisbane, Parramatta, Cronulla-Sutherland, Manly Warringah, Penrith and North Queensland.

The preliminary finals are the same four teams as the 2015 finals series.

Qualification 

Melbourne qualified for their 7th straight finals series, it was also their 2nd straight first-place finish. Sydney returned to the finals after missing out in 2016. Brisbane qualified for the 4th straight year. Parramatta made their first finals appearance since the 2009 Grand Final, it was also their first top four finish since 2005. Cronulla returned to the finals for the 3rd straight year after winning the 2016 NRL Grand Final. Manly played their first finals game since 2014. Penrith returned to the finals after competing in the 2016 finals series. North Queensland qualified for their 7th straight finals series, giving them and Melbourne the best current finals streak.

Venues 
The matches of the 2017 NRL finals series were contested at four venues in three different states around the country.

Melbourne's AAMI Park hosted 2 matches, Brisbane's Suncorp Stadium hosted 1 match and Sydney hosted the remaining 6 matches, which were played at Allianz Stadium and ANZ Stadium.

Finals Structure 
The system used for the 2017 NRL finals series is a final eight system. The top four teams in the eight receive the "double chance" when they play in week-one qualifying finals, such that if a top-four team loses in the first week it still remains in the finals, playing a semi-final the next week against the winner of an elimination final. The bottom four of the eight play knock-out games – only the winners survive and move on to the next week. Home-state advantage goes to the team with the higher ladder position in the first two weeks, to the qualifying final winners in the third week.

In the second week, the winners of the qualifying finals receive a bye to the third week. The losers of the qualifying final plays the elimination finals winners in a semi-final. In the third week, the winners of the semi-finals from week two play the winners of the qualifying finals in the first week. The winners of those matches move on to the Grand Final at ANZ Stadium in Sydney

Qualifying & Elimination Finals

1st Qualifying final

2nd Qualifying final

1st Elimination final

2nd Elimination final

Semi-finals

1st Semi-final

2nd Semi-final

Preliminary Finals

1st Preliminary final

2nd Preliminary final

Grand Final

References

Finals series